Emel Emin is a Romanian Crimean Tatar poet, translator, Turkologist, and educator.
She writes her work in Turkish. Although most of her poetry is free verse, she sometimes uses syllabic verse and she admires Arabic prosody. With love for traditional forms of poetry she also published ghazal and rubayat. She is associated with the Writers' Union of Romania and Turkish Language Association in Turkey.

Biography
Emel was born on 12 December 1938 in what was formerly named Pazarjik, Dobruja, Kingdom of Romania. Soon after that, at the beginning of World War II, Romania ceded Southern Dobruja to Bulgaria and today the town is officially known as Dobrich. During her early years spent in Bulgaria she studied at the Pedagogical High School in Sofia and then, in 1960, she graduated from the Faculty of Philology of Sv. Kliment Ohridski University of Sofia specializing in Oriental studies. She worked as a teacher of Turkish in Dobrich and Belogradets, Varna Province.

In 1967, marrying Atilla in Romania, she resettled to her homeland in Constanța. She was one of the first Turkish language teachers in Romania. Since 1972 she taught at the Pedagogical High School in Constanta. Since 1991 she was a lecturer of Turkish literature at the Faculty of Letters and the College of schoolmasters of Ovidius University of Constanța.

Literary presses and journals she has been published include Renkler (Bucharest), Türk Dili (Ankara), Turnalar (Izmir), IIS (Prizren), Kado (Iași), Karadeniz (Constanța), Hakses (Constanța), Emel (Constanța).

Collections of verses that she published in Romania and Turkey include Umut, Arzu, Hanımeli, Divan esintisi

See also 
 Crimean Tatars
 List of Crimean Tatars

References

External links 
 
 
 
 
 
 

20th-century Romanian poets
Romanian women poets
Tatar poets
Crimean Tatar poets
Bulgarian people of Crimean Tatar descent
Romanian Muslims
Crimean Tatar schoolteachers
Romanian schoolteachers
People from Dobrich
Living people
Sofia University alumni
1938 births
20th-century Romanian women writers